Jeet (Jeetendra Madnani) is an Indian actor, Business Man, Producer, television judge and television presenter. He owns the production house Grassroot Entertainment and Jeetz Filmworks.

Career 

Jeet started his modeling career in 1993. His first acting assignment was Bishabriksha (199495), a Bengali TV series directed by Bishnu Palchaudhuri. He made his big screen debut with Chandu (2001), a Telugu film. His first success came in 2002, opposite Priyanka Trivedi, through Sathi, a highly successful romantic drama, directed by Haranath Chakraborty, for which he won the Bengal Film Journalists' Association – Most Promising Actor Award and Anandalok Awards for Best Actor. In the same year, he acted in the Bengali remake of Jo Jeeta Wohi Sikandar. This initial success was followed by other critical and commercial successes, including Nater Guru, Sangee, Bandhan and Yuddho. In 2005, he acted alongside Koel Mallick in Nater Guru, which released to critical and commercial success and fetched him his second Anandalok Award for Best Actor. This success was short-lived as Jeet starred in some commercial failures, including Saathihara, Priyotoma and Ghatak but this failure was short-lived as Jeet starred in Jor, which became a box office hit.

2010 proved to be a commercially successful year for Jeet as he starred in Wanted and  Dui Prithibi, both of which were critically and commercially successful ventures; the latter being the highest grosser of 2010, according to a study conducted by FICCI & Deloitte. In 2013, he appeared in the crime thriller Boss: Born to Rule, which was Jeet's first pan-India release. The film proved to be one of the biggest hits of 2013, grossing  and also earned him his first Filmfare Awards East nomination.

From 2014 to 2016, he has starred in many films, including four critically and commercially successful ventures – the psychological thriller The Royal Bengal Tiger, the comedy thriller Bachchan, the action comedy Badsha The Don and more recently the action drama Abhimaan and in 2018 the action thriller film Bagh bandi khela released on 16 November 2018. He also worked with Adil.

In television, he appeared on several reality shows and also hosted some, including Koti Takar Baaji and Bigg Boss Bangla.

Personal life 
Jeet was born into a Sindhi family. He had reportedly been in a relationship with his co-star Swastika Mukherjee during the shooting of the film Mastan. Jeet subsequently married Mohna Ratlani, a school teacher from Lucknow, India, on 24 February 2011. They became parents to a daughter on 12 December 2012.

Filmography

1993–96 
Jeet started with modelling assignments and then shifted to serials like Bishabriksha in 1994–95, directed by Bishnu Palchaudhuri, in which he played Taracharan; In Janani by Bishnu Palchaudhuri, in which he played Anil; and Daughters of the Century by Tapan Sinha, in which he was cast in the roles of Champiya

2001–04 
Jeet collaborated with Haranath Chakraborty for Naater Guru, which had the debutante Koel Mallick in the female lead. He later acted with Priyanka Trivedi in the film Sangee, released on 26 December 2003. In 2004, his first film was with Raima Sen, named Shakti. His other films of the year include Premi (opposite debutant Chandana Sharma), Mastan, Aakrosh, and Bandhan.

2005–08 
In 2005, he acted in Yuddho along with Mithun Chakraborty, Debashree Roy and Koel Mallick. In 2005, Jeet collaborated with Koel Mallick in Shubhodrishti and Manik, both directed by Prabhat Roy. Jeet won the Anandalok Awards for Best Actor for Manik.

Jeet again acted with Koel Mallick in two consecutive films – Ghatak and Hero.  He played Govindlal in Raja Sen's directional venture Krishnakanter Will, which starred Swastika Mukherjee and Monali Thakur as female leads. His next film was with Hrishitaa Bhatt, titled Bidhatar Lekha, which starred Priyanshu Chatterjee as the main antagonist. The film explores two lovers and their relationship in their last life that had come to a tragic end, and the pair confronts each other again in the current incarnation. He again collaborated with Swastika Mukherjee for the film Partner in 2008. Jeet collaborated with Varsha Priyadarshini for Jor which, made on a budget Rs. 1.25 crore, crossed seven weeks in theater and proved to be a hit in the box office.

2009–present 

Jeet appeared with Koel Mallick in the films Saat Paake Bandha and Neel Akasher Chandni. He starred in Dui Prithibi, which was released on 14 October 2010. Dui Prithibi was the highest grosser of 2010, according to a study conducted by FICCI & Deloitte.

Jeet next starred with Srabanti Chatterjee in Fighter, the remake of the Telugu film Lakshyam. He worked with Nusrat Jahan in Raj Chakraborty's action film Shotru, which was a remake of the Tamil film Singam. Roshni Mukherjee of The Times of India gave the film a positive review. Jeet reappeared with Priyanka Trivedi in Hello Memsaheb. In 2012 he became a producer with the movie 100% Love, in which he also acted together with Koel Mallick. His second film in 2012 with Sayantika Banerjee was Awara, which was the highest-grossing film of the year 2012. In 2013, he appeared in the gangster action film Boss with Subhashree Ganguly which was a remake of Mahesh Babu's Businessman. Although the film received mixed reviews from critics, Jaya Biswas of The Times of India wrote that "Jeet [...] can dance, fight and emote as well." Jeet won the Kalakar Awards for The King of Tollywood for the film. He was also nominated for Best Actor in the inaugural ceremony of Filmfare Awards East.

Jeet acted in an extended special performance with Abir Chatterjee and Shraddha Das in Neeraj Pandey's debut Bengali production venture The Royal Bengal Tiger. Produced by Neeraj Pandey's Friday Filmworks and Jeet's Grassroot Entertainment and distributed by Viacom 18 Motion Pictures, the film turned out to be a critical and commercial success. Jeet's performance of a suave and slightly dangerous Anjan who completely transforms the main protagonist in the film, received critical acclaim. He also acted in Baba Yadav's second directional venture Game, in which he played an officer of the Defence Intelligence Agency (DIA) working in the Indian Army. In 2014, Jeet co-starred with Aindrita Ray (in her debut Bengali film) in the film Bachchan, which released on 3 October 2014, to positive response from critics as well as from audiences.

In 2021, he starred in Baazi, a film made under his production house Jeetz Filmworks, opposite Mimi Chakraborty. It was released in October during Puja holidays.

In 2022, he starred in Ravaan, a film made under his production house Jeetz Filmworks.  It released on Eid al-Fitr. He is currently working with director Rajesh Ganguly for his upcoming film titled Chengiz, an action thriller.

Other works

Brand endorsements 
A relatively small budget ad of a regional brand of men's underwear had Jeet in the lead. He became the brand ambassador of Fashion at Big Bazaar (a unit of Future Group) on 18 September 2013. In 2005, a special Durga Puja campaign of Thums Up launched Jeet as their brand ambassador in West Bengal. Jeet launched the Times Food Guide 2012 in Kolkata.

Sports ventures 
Jeet was also the ex-captain of the Bengal Tigers in the Celebrity Cricket League. Jeet had also acquired the Kolkata franchise of the first-ever multi-nation 2016 Premier Futsal season that started on 15 July 2016. The team is known as "Kolkata 5s" as each franchise was similarly named in the inaugural season.

Television appearances

Awards and nominations

References

External links 

 
 

Living people
1978 births
People from New Alipore
Indian people of Sindhi descent
Male actors from Kolkata
Male actors in Bengali cinema
Bhawanipur Education Society College alumni
Bengal Film Journalists' Association Award winners
8